Bekrabad (also Romanized as Bekrābād) is a village in Bam Rural District, Bam and Safiabad District, Esfarayen County, North Khorasan Province, Iran. At the 2006 census, its population was 244, in 62 families.

References 

Populated places in Esfarayen County